Leonard Alfred Fulford (11 November 1928 – 27 November 2011) was a British commercial photographer and director, with a specialty for photography of still life. He was one of the founding members of BFCS. With studios in London, New York, Los Angeles and Milan, BFCS was one of the most successful commercial production companies of all time, winning the Palme d'Or at the Cannes Advertising Festival an unprecedented six times. Fulford directed the popular Go to work on an egg television commercials for the Egg Marketing Board during the 1960s. Fulford also directed many of the iconic Guinness television commercials of the 1970s and 1980s, along with other memorable spots like the Courage Best 'Rabbit Rabbit' commercial featuring the specially written song by Chas and Dave, and the iconic Simple skincare commercial in which robotic arms spray a pristine white lily with colouring and perfume.

His work earned him numerous awards and much recognition. The famous "Go to work on an egg" television ad campaign which he directed earned him the nickname "the eggman" within the industry. John Lennon makes reference to Len as "the eggman" in The Beatles song "I Am the Walrus".

Len Fulford retired in 1995 and resided in East Anglia. He died in Friston, Suffolk, on 27 November 2011, at the age of 83. He is survived by three sons.  His wife, the former Gillian Fox, whom he married in 1953, died in 2007.

References

External links
Campaign Paper
British Film Institute
British Film Institute

1928 births
2011 deaths
Television commercial directors
British television directors
Photographers from Suffolk
People from Suffolk Coastal (district)
Commercial photographers